Comparatist or comparativist may refer to:
 A student or a scholar in the field of comparative literature or comparative law
 The Comparatist, an American comparative-literature journal